State Road 294 (NM 294) is a  state highway in the US state of New Mexico. NM 294's southern terminus is at the end of state maintenance, and the northern terminus is at U.S. Route 60 (US 60) and US 85 in Taiban

Major intersections

See also

References

294
Transportation in De Baca County, New Mexico